A Statuette of a Bird from the 15th–14th centuries BC, was found in Lchashen, Armenia. It is now in the History Museum of Armenia's collection under the number 2009-50.

Description 
The statuette of a bird is a bronze sculpture of a bird sitting on a pedestal measuring 17.5 x 12.2 x 3.3 cm, with a long neck and tail. Its round, convex eyes formerly had coloured incrustations in the depressions of the center. The body is hollow, and has wedge-shaped openings on the breast and sides to create the wings. The bird's wings, breasts, and tail are decorated by a linear pattern. The pedestal is a square column with an anchorshaped base covered in triangular holes and linear patterns. The anchor ends are terminated by a miniature sculpture of a frog that has bulging eyes and a large mouth.

References

Further reading 
 View from the Bronze Age, album-catalog, History Museum of Armenia, 2010
 Harutyun Mnatsakanyan, The Main Stages of Lchashen's Development of Culture, Yerevan, 1968
 Hasmik Israelian, Cults and Beliefs in the Late Bronze Age of Armenia, Yerevan, 1973

External links 
 The Main Stages of Lchashen's Development of Culture

Archaeology of Armenia
History Museum of Armenia